Anti-Müllerian hormone (AMH), also known as Müllerian-inhibiting hormone (MIH), is a glycoprotein hormone structurally related to inhibin and activin from the transforming growth factor beta superfamily, whose key roles are in growth differentiation and folliculogenesis. In humans, it is encoded by the  gene, on chromosome 19p13.3, while its receptor is encoded by the  gene on chromosome 12.

AMH is activated by SOX9 in the Sertoli cells of the male fetus. Its expression inhibits the development of the female reproductive tract, or Müllerian ducts (paramesonephric ducts), in the male embryo, thereby arresting the development of fallopian tubes, uterus, and upper vagina. AMH expression is critical to sex differentiation at a specific time during fetal development, and appears to be tightly regulated by nuclear receptor SF-1, transcription GATA factors, sex-reversal gene DAX1, and follicle-stimulating hormone (FSH). Mutations in both the AMH gene and the type II AMH receptor have been shown to cause the persistence of Müllerian derivatives in males that are otherwise normally masculinized.

AMH is also a product of granulosa cells of the preantral and small antral follicles in women. As such, AMH is only present in the ovary until menopause. Production of AMH regulates folliculogenesis by inhibiting recruitment of follicles from the resting pool in order to select for the dominant follicle, after which the production of AMH diminishes. As a product of the granulosa cells, which envelop each egg and provide them energy, AMH can also serve as a molecular biomarker for relative size of the ovarian reserve. In humans, this is helpful because the number of cells in the follicular reserve can be used to predict timing of menopause. In bovine, AMH can be used for selection of females in multi-ovulatory embryo transfer programs by predicting the number of antral follicles developed to ovulation. AMH can also be used as a marker for ovarian dysfunction, such as in women with polycystic ovary syndrome (PCOS).

Structure 
AMH is a dimeric glycoprotein with a molar mass of 140 kDa. The molecule consists of two identical subunits linked by sulfide bridges, and characterized by the N-terminal dimer (pro-region) and C-terminal dimer. AMH binds to its Type 2 receptor AMHR2, which phosphorylates a type I receptor under the TGF beta signaling pathway.

Function

Embryogenesis 
In male mammals, AMH prevents the development of the Müllerian ducts into the uterus and other Müllerian structures. The effect is ipsilateral, that is each testis suppresses Müllerian development only on its own side. In humans, this action takes place during the first eight weeks of gestation.  If no hormone is produced from the gonads, the Müllerian ducts automatically develop, while the Wolffian ducts, which are responsible for male reproductive parts, automatically die. Amounts of AMH that are measurable in the blood vary by age and sex. AMH works by interacting with specific receptors on the surfaces of the cells of target tissues (anti-Müllerian hormone receptors). The best-known and most specific effect, mediated through the AMH type II receptors, includes programmed cell death (apoptosis) of the target tissue (the fetal Müllerian ducts).

Ovarian 
AMH is produced by granulosa cells from pre-antral and antral follicles, restricting expression to growing follicles, until they have reached the size and differentiation state at which they are selected for dominance by the action of pituitary FSH. Ovarian AMH expression has been observed as early as 36 weeks’ gestation in the humans’ fetus. AMH expression is greatest in the recruitment stage of folliculogenesis, in the preantral and small antral follicles. This expression diminishes as follicles develop and enter selection stage, upon which FSH expression increases. Some authorities suggest it is a measure of certain aspects of ovarian function, useful in assessing conditions such as polycystic ovary syndrome and premature ovarian failure.

Other 
AMH production by the Sertoli cells of the testes remains high throughout childhood in males but declines to low levels during puberty and adult life. AMH has been shown to regulate production of sex hormones, and changing AMH levels (rising in females, falling in males) may be involved in the onset of puberty in both sexes. Functional AMH receptors have also been found to be expressed in neurons in the brains of embryonic mice, and are thought to play a role in sexually dimorphic brain development and consequent development of gender-specific behaviours. In a clade of Sebastes rockfishes in the Northwest Pacific Ocean, a duplicated copy of the AMH gene (called AMHY)  is the master sex-determining gene. In vitro experiments demonstrate that the overexpression of AMHY causes female-to-male sex reversal in at least one species, S. schlegelii.

Pathology 
In males, inadequate embryonal AMH activity can lead to persistent Müllerian duct syndrome (PMDS), in which a rudimentary uterus is present and testes are usually undescended. The AMH gene (AMH) or the gene for its receptor (AMH-RII) are usually abnormal. AMH measurements have also become widely used in the evaluation of testicular presence and function in infants with intersex conditions, ambiguous genitalia, and cryptorchidism.

A study published in Nature Medicine found a link between hormonal imbalance in the womb and polycystic ovary syndrome (PCOS), specifically prenatal exposure to anti-Müllerian hormone. For the study, the researchers injected pregnant mice with AMH so that they had a higher than normal concentration of the hormone. Indeed, they gave birth to daughters who later developed PCOS-like tendencies. These included problems with fertility, delayed puberty, and erratic ovulation. To reverse it, the researchers dosed the polycystic mice with an IVF drug called cetrorelix, which made the symptoms to go away. These experiments should be confirmed in humans, but it could be the first step in understanding the relationship between the polycystic ovary and the anti-Müllerian hormone.

Blood levels 
In healthy females AMH is either just detectable or undetectable in cord blood at birth and demonstrates a marked rise by three months of age; while still detectable it falls until four years of age before rising linearly until eight years of age remaining fairly constant from mid-childhood to early adulthood – it does not change significantly during puberty. The rise during childhood and adolescence is likely reflective of different stages of follicle development. From 25 years of age AMH declines to undetectable levels at menopause.

The standard measurement of AMH follows the Generation II assay. This should give the same values as the previously used IBC assay, but AMH values from the previously used DSL assay should be multiplied with 1.39 to conform to current standards because it used different antibodies.

Weak evidence suggests that AMH should be measured only in the early follicular phase because of variation over the menstrual cycle. Also, AMH levels decrease under current use of oral contraceptives and current tobacco smoking.

Reference ranges 
Reference ranges for anti-Müllerian hormone, as estimated from reference groups in the United States, are as follows:

Females:

Males:

AMH measurements may be less accurate if the person being measured is vitamin D deficient. Note that males are born with higher AMH levels than females in order to initiate sexual differentiation, and in women, AMH levels decrease over time as fertility decreases as well.

Clinical usage

General fertility assessment 
Comparison of an individual's AMH level with respect to average levels is useful in fertility assessment, as it provides a guide to ovarian reserve and identifies women that may need to consider either egg freezing or trying for a pregnancy sooner rather than later if their long-term future fertility is poor. A higher level of anti-Müllerian hormone when tested in women in the general population has been found to have a positive correlation with natural fertility in women aged 30–44 aiming to conceive spontaneously, even after adjusting for age. However, this correlation was not found in a comparable study of younger women (aged 20 to 30 years).

In vitro fertilization 
AMH is a predictor for ovarian response in in vitro fertilization (IVF). Measurement of AMH supports clinical decisions, but alone it is not a suitable predictor of IVF success. Additionally, AMH levels are used to estimate a woman's remaining egg supply.

According to NICE guidelines of in vitro fertilization, an anti-Müllerian hormone level of less than or equal to 5.4 pmol/L (0.8 ng/mL) predicts a low response to gonadotrophin stimulation in IVF, while a level greater than or equal to 25.0 pmol/L (3.6 ng/mL) predicts a high response. Other cut-off values found in the literature vary between 0.7 and 20 pmol/L (0.1 and 2.97 ng/mL) for low response to ovarian hyperstimulation. Subsequently, higher AMH levels are associated with greater chance of live birth after IVF, even after adjusting for age. AMH can thereby be used to rationalise the programme of ovulation induction and decisions about the number of embryos to transfer in assisted reproduction techniques to maximise pregnancy success rates whilst minimising the risk of ovarian hyperstimulation syndrome (OHSS). AMH can predict an excessive response in ovarian hyperstimulation with a sensitivity and specificity of 82% and 76%, respectively.

Measuring AMH alone may be misleading as high levels occur in conditions like polycystic ovarian syndrome and therefore AMH levels should be considered in conjunction with a transvaginal scan of the ovaries to assess antral follicle count and ovarian volume.

Natural remedies 
Studies into treatments to improve low ovarian reserve and low AMH levels have met with some success. Current best available evidence suggests that DHEA improves ovarian function, increases pregnancy chances and, by reducing aneuploidy, lowers miscarriage rates. The studies into DHEA for low AMH show that a dose of 75 mg for a period of 16 weeks should be taken. Improvement of oocyte/embryo quality with DHEA supplementation potentially suggests a new concept of ovarian aging, where ovarian environments, but not oocytes themselves, age. DHEA has positive outcomes for women with AMH levels over 0.8 ng/mL or 5.7 pmol/L DHEA has no apparent effect on oocytes or ovarian environments under this range.

Studies on CoQ10 supplementation in an aged animal model delayed depletion of ovarian reserve, restored oocyte mitochondrial gene expression, and improved mitochondrial activity. Authors note that to replicate the 12–16 weeks of using CoQ10 supplements on mice to achieve these results would be the equivalent to a decade in humans.

Vitamin D is believed to play a role in AMH regulation. The AMH gene promoter contains a vitamin D response element that may cause vitamin D status to influence serum AMH levels. Women with levels of Vitamin D of 267.8 ± 66.4 nmol/L show a 4 times better success rate with IVF procedure than those with low levels of 104.3 ± 21 nmol/L. Vitamin D deficiency should be considered when serum AMH levels are obtained for diagnosis.

Women with cancer
In women with cancer, radiation therapy and chemotherapy can damage the ovarian reserve. In such cases, a pre-treatment AMH is useful in predicting the long-term post-chemotherapy loss of ovarian function, which may indicate fertility preservation strategies such as oocyte cryopreservation. A post-treatment AMH is associated with decreased fertility.

Granulosa cell tumors of the ovary secrete AMH, and AMH testing has a sensitivity ranging between 76 and 93% in diagnosing such tumors. AMH is also useful in diagnosing recurrence of granulosa cell tumors.

Neutering status in animals 
In veterinary medicine, AMH measurements are used to determine neutering status in male and female dogs and cats. AMH levels can also be used to diagnose cases of ovarian remnant syndrome.

Biomarker of polycystic ovary syndrome 
Polycystic ovary syndrome (PCOS) is an endocrine disorder most commonly found in women of reproductive age that is characterized by oligo- or anovulation, hyperandrogenism, and polycystic ovaries (PCO). This endocrine disorder increases AMH levels at nearly two to three times higher in women with PCOS than in normal type women. This is often attributed to the increased follicle count number characteristic of PCOS, indicating an increase in granulosa cells since they surround each individual egg. However, increased AMH levels have also been attributed not just to the increased number of follicles, but also to an increased amount of AMH produced per follicle. The high levels of androgens, characteristic of PCOS, also stimulate and provide feedback for increased production of AMH, as well. In this way, AMH has been increasingly considered to be a tool or biomarker that can be used to diagnose or indicate PCOS.

Biomarker of Turner syndrome 
Turner syndrome is the most common sex chromosome-related inherited diseases in female around the world, with the incidence of 1 in 2000 live female births. One of the significant pathological features is the premature ovarian failure, leading to amenorrhea or even infertility. Follicle stimulating hormone and inhibin B were recommended to be monitored routinely by specialists to speculate the condition of ovary. Recently, anti-Müllerian hormone is advised as a more accurate biomarker for follicular development by several researchers. The biological function of anti-Müllerian hormone in ovary is to counteract the recruitment of primordial follicles triggered by FSH, reserving the follicle pool for further recruitment and ovulation. When menopause takes place, the serum concentration of anti-Müllerian hormone will be nearly undetectable amongst normal women. Thus, variations in AMH levels during childhood may theoretically predict the duration of any given girl's reproductive life span, assuming that the speed of the continuous follicle loss is comparable between individuals.

Potential future usage
AMH has been synthesized. Its ability to inhibit growth of tissue derived from the Müllerian ducts has raised hopes of usefulness in the treatment of a variety of medical conditions including endometriosis, adenomyosis, and uterine cancer. Research is underway in several laboratories.
If there were more standardized AMH assays, it could potentially be used as a biomarker of polycystic ovary syndrome.

In mice, an increase in AMH has been shown to reduce the number of growing follicles and thus the overall size of the ovaries. This increase in AMH production reduces primary, secondary and antral follicles without reducing the number of primordial follicles suggesting a blockade of primordial follicle activation. This may provide a viable method of contraception which protects the ovarian reserve of oocytes during chemotherapy without extracting them from the body allowing the potential for natural reproduction later in life.

Names 
The adjective "Müllerian" is written either "Müllerian" or "müllerian", depending on the governing style guide; the derived term with the prefix of "anti-" is then "anti-Müllerian", "anti-müllerian", or "antimüllerian". The Müllerian ducts are named after Johannes Peter Müller.

A list of the names that have been used for the antimüllerian hormone is as follows. For the sake of simplicity, this list ignores some orthographic variations; for example, it gives only one row for "Müllerian-inhibiting hormone", although there are 4 acceptable stylings thereof (cap M or lowercase m, hyphen or space).

See also 
 Alfred Jost - discoverer
 Anti-Müllerian hormone receptor
 Freemartin - involvement of anti-Müllerian hormone in cattle twins of mixed sex
 Persistent Müllerian duct syndrome (PMDS)
 Sexual differentiation

References 

Animal developmental biology
Fish hormones
Hormones of the embryo
Biomarkers